Republican Township is one of ten townships in Jefferson County, Indiana, United States. As of the 2010 census, its population was 1,599 and it contained 639 housing units.

Republican Township was created on March 12, 1817 by the Jefferson County Common Pleas Court. It has had the following post offices, which are no longer in operation: Hargan (June 4, 1884 – July 29, 1898); Ramsey's Mills (Dec. 19, 1832-Jan. 14, 1848); Swanville (June 10, 1847-Oct. 23, 1866) and (Jan. 8, 1867-Jan. 15, 1907). There is no active post office in the township.

Ramseys Mills Post Office was renamed Kent, which operated from Jan. 14, 1848 until March 26, 1965, when mail service was transferred to Madison.
  
Its active churches include the Kent Baptist, Christian and Methodist churches. Past churches include the Ebenezer Methodist (ca. 1840-?): New Liberty Methodist (ca. 1900-1995/90), Providence Methodist (ca. 1830-?), Sharon Hill Presbyterian (1845-after 1945); White River Baptist (1811-1886/87) and White River Christian (founded as a New Light church in 1817, moved to Kent where the Kent Christian Church is its successor).

Geography
The streams of Big Spring Creek, Chicken Run, Ramsey Creek and Thompson Branch run through this township.

Unincorporated towns
 Kent
 Swanville

Adjacent townships
 Smyrna Township (northeast)
 Hanover Township (east)
 Madison Township (east)
 Saluda Township (southeast)
 Lexington Township, Scott County (southwest)
 Graham Township (northwest)

Cemeteries
The township contains cemeteries: Blankenship, Kent, Landon, Liberty, Lloyd, Scotland, 
Sharon  Hill, Slippery Point and White River.

Major highways
  Indiana State Road 56
  Indiana State Road 256
  Indiana State Road 356

Airports and landing strips
 Wilkersons Airport

References
 U.S. Board on Geographic Names (GNIS)
 United States Census Bureau cartographic boundary files

Baker, J. David, The Postal History of Indiana, 1976, Philatelic Bibliophile, P.O. Box 213971, Louisville, Ky. 1976.

John Paul Chapter DAR. Jefferson County Cemetery Transcriptions, Madison, 1941.

PAUL (1995): John Paul. Jefferson County Court Records 1811–1826. Transcribed by the Jefferson County Historical Society, Madison.

External links
 Indiana Township Association
 United Township Association of Indiana

Townships in Jefferson County, Indiana
Townships in Indiana